Monakovo is a rural locality (a selo) in Starooskolsky District, Belgorod Oblast, Russia. The population was 1,098 as of 2010. There are 12 streets.

Geography 
Monakovo is located 25 km southwest of Stary Oskol (the district's administrative centre) by road. Dolgaya Polyana is the nearest rural locality.

References 

Rural localities in Starooskolsky District